Vilshany is an urban-type settlement in Kharkiv Raion of Kharkiv Oblast in Ukraine. It is located on both banks of the Kryvorotivka, a right tributary of the Udy, in the basin of the Don. Vilshany belongs to Solonytsivka settlement hromada, one of the hromadas of Ukraine. Population: 

Until 18 July 2020, Vilshany belonged to Derhachi Raion. The raion was abolished in July 2020 as part of the administrative reform of Ukraine, which reduced the number of raions of Kharkiv Oblast to seven. The area of Derhachi Raion was merged into Kharkiv Raion.

Economy

Transportation
The closest railway station is in Peresichne, a few kilometers east, on the railway line connecting Kharkiv and Zolochiv which continues across the Russian border to Gotnya.

The settlement has road access to Kharkiv and Bohodukhiv.

References

Urban-type settlements in Kharkiv Raion
Kharkovsky Uyezd